Simpson County Courthouse may refer to:

Simpson County Courthouse (Kentucky), Franklin, Kentucky
Simpson County Courthouse (Mississippi), Mendenhall, Mississippi, listed on the National Register of Historic Places